Tegetthoff may refer to:
 Wilhelm von Tegetthoff, an Austrian admiral
 , a central battery ironclad 
 , an Austro-Hungarian dreadnought class
 , the lead ship in the class
 Admiral Tegetthoff - main ship of Austro-Hungarian North Pole expedition